The 2016–17 South Dakota Coyotes men's basketball team represented the University of South Dakota during the 2016–17 NCAA Division I men's basketball season. The Coyotes, led by second-year head coach Craig Smith, played their home games at the brand new Sanford Coyote Sports Center in Vermillion, South Dakota as members of Summit League. They finished the season 22–12, 12–4 in Summit League play to win the Summit League regular season championship. As the No. 1 seed in the Summit League tournament, they defeated Western Illinois in the quarterfinals before losing to South Dakota State in the semifinals. As a regular season conference champion who failed to win their conference tournament title, they received an automatic bid to the National Invitation Tournament where they lost in the first round to Iowa.

Previous season
The Coyotes finished the 2015–16 season 14–18, 5–11 in Summit League play to finish in eighth place. They lost in the quarterfinals of The Summit League tournament to IPFW.

Roster

Schedule and results

|-
!colspan=9 style=| Exhibition

|-
!colspan=9 style=| Non-conference regular season

|-
!colspan=9 style=| The Summit League regular season

|-
!colspan=9 style=| The Summit League tournament

|-
!colspan=9 style=| NIT

References

South Dakota Coyotes men's basketball seasons
South Dakota
South Dakota
Coyo
Coyo